Feshangan (also Romanized as Feshangān; also known as Pashangān) is a village in Rahmatabad Rural District, Zarqan District, Shiraz County, Fars Province, Iran. At the 2006 census, its population was 446, in 113 families.

References 

Populated places in Zarqan County